Brigadier General Mark A. McAlister, USA is the former Commanding General of the Soldier Support Institute at Fort Jackson, South Carolina which is responsible for training all of the Army's Human Resource and Financial Management soldiers.

Education 

Mark A. McAlister is a 1981 graduate of Hampton Institute with a Bachelor of Science degree in Accounting. He also holds a Master of Business Administration from Indiana University with Finance, Accounting, and Banking majors. His military education includes the Finance Officer Basic and Advanced Courses, Combined Arms and Service Staff School, the United States Army Command and General Staff College, and the Industrial College of the Armed Forces.

Military career 

He assumed his current assignment as the Commanding General, U.S. Army Soldier Support Institute on 1 July 2009.

Prior to joining the Soldier Support Institute, Brigadier General McAlister was assigned to the Pentagon as Executive Officer to the Assistant Secretary of the Army (Financial Management and Comptroller) and Chief of Plans, Programs and Budget Integration.

Among his many other assignments, Brigadier General McAlister has served as Commander of the 18th Soldier Support Group (Airborne), Fort Bragg, NC; Chief of the Army's Defense Integrated Military Human Resource System program; Chief of  PERSCOM’s Finance Branch; Commander of the 8th Finance Battalion, Baumholder, Germany; Executive Officer of the 208th Finance Battalion, Schwetzingen, Germany; S3 for the 266th Finance Command, Heidelberg, Germany; Brigade S1, 175th Theater Finance Command, Korea; Deputy Finance Officer, 82nd Airborne Division; and Chief Disbursing Division, Chief Military Pay, and Commander of the 107th Finance Section, Fort Bragg, North Carolina.

He has also served at the US Army Finance School, as the Executive Officer to the Chief of the Finance Corps/Commandant, Chief of Combat Development, and Chief of Finance Branch Personnel Proponency, Fort Benjamin Harrison, Indiana.

Deployments 

Operation Support Hope in Rwanda
Task Force Hawk in Albania
Task Force Falcon in Kosovo
Operation Iraqi Freedom I and III.

Decorations and honors 

   Legion of Merit with two Oak Leaf Cluster
   Bronze Star with one Oak Leaf Cluster
   Meritorious Service Medal with five Oak Leaf Clusters
 Joint Service Commendation Medal
   Army Commendation Medal with three Oak Leaf Clusters
   Army Achievement Medal with three Oak Leaf Clusters
 Department of the Army Staff Identification Badge
   Parachutist Badge
 German basic parachutist badge

References 

Brigadier General Mark A. McAlister, United States Army

McAlister assumes SSI command from Mustion 

Army Times, 1-star selections announced by DoD 

United States Army generals
Recipients of the Legion of Merit
Year of birth missing (living people)
Living people